The Smart BEST is an experimental Japanese two-car self-charging battery electric multiple unit (BEMU) train developed and manufactured by Kinki Sharyo in 2012 to demonstrate the feasibility of battery train technology for use on non-electrified rural lines. The name is an acronym for "Battery Engine Synergy Train". The train has been tested on JR West and JR Shikoku lines since late 2012.

Overview
The Smart BEST train operates using GS Yuasa LIM30H-8A lithium-ion storage battery modules recharged in operation by a small-capacity "e-Brid Plus" diesel engine.

Formation
The two-car train is formed as shown below, with one motored (M) car and one non-powered trailer (T) car.

Interior
Seating accommodation is arranged as 2+2 abreast transverse seating with seat backs that flip over to face the direction of travel.

History

The "Smart BEST" train was unveiled to the media in October 2012 at the Kinki Sharyo factory in Osaka, before being moved to Yonago, Tottori for test running on the Sanin Main Line, Sakai Line, and Hakubi Line. It was returned to Kinki Sharyo in December 2012. In December 2013, the train was moved to Takamatsu, Kagawa, and started test running on a number of lines in Shikoku, including the Kōtoku Line, Naruto Line, and Tokushima Line.

From September until December 2014, the train was used in revenue service on promotional "Hello Kitty" services in the Wakayama area.

See also
 NE Train, an experimental battery railcar tested by JR East
 EV-E301 series, a BEMU set operated by JR East on the Karasuyama Line since 2014
 BEC819 series, an AC BEMU operated by JR Kyushu since 2016
 EV-E801 series, an AC BEMU operated by JR East on the Oga Line since 2017

References

External links

 Kinki Sharyo press release (October 2012) 
Train-related introductions in 2012
Experimental vehicles
Electric multiple units of Japan
Science and technology in Japan
Battery electric multiple units
Kinki Sharyo multiple units